The 171st Division() was created in April 1949 under the Regulation of the Redesignations of All Organizations and Units of the Army, issued by Central Military Commission on November 1, 1948,basing on the 6th Training and Consolidation Division of Northeastern Military Region. The division was put under control of Liaodong Military District.

The division was basically a second-line unit and never went into battle.

In July 1950 511th Regiment was absorbed into 39th Corps.

In August 1950 the rest of the division was disbanded and absorbed into the Air Force.

As of July 1950 the division was composed of:
511th Regiment;
512th Regiment;
513th Regiment.

References

Infantry divisions of the People's Liberation Army
Military units and formations established in 1949
Military units and formations disestablished in 1950